Miley is an unincorporated community in Hampton County, South Carolina, United States. Miley has a post office with ZIP code 29933.

References

Unincorporated communities in Hampton County, South Carolina
Unincorporated communities in South Carolina